Khortytsia or Khortytsa is a Ukrainian company based in Zaporizhzhia.  Khortytsia markets vodka in the United States under the brand name Khor.

References

Horilkas
Distilleries in Ukraine
Manufacturing companies of Ukraine
Ukrainian brands
Ukrainian distilled drinks
Ukrainian vodkas
Alcoholic drink brands